Madiou Konate (born 12 January 1982 in Dakar) is a former Senegalese football striker.

Career

Early career 
Konate started his career in his native Senegal at local side AS Douanes before being spotted by scouts from Al-Ahly. He joined the Al-Mabarrahn side, scoring 15 times in 44 games for his new club, before moving to outfit Al-Ittihad. In 2005, he joined Molde FK, where he is best remembered for being awarded a yellow card just ten seconds into his debut against Lillestrøm SK, and for scoring in the 4–2 cup final win the same year against the same club. In 2008, he joined Hønefoss BK.

Move to Turkey
On 5 July 2008 Konate signed a five-year-contract with Turkey Ankaraspor. The transfer fee was estimated to be around €400,000. Madiou quickly became a fan favourite, and established himself as a talented goal scorer.

Position
His favourite position is second striker although he has played as winger or as an attacking midfielder. He is well known for his pace.

Career statistics 

Notes

References

External links 
  Player stats in Molde FK
  2008 season at Hønefoss BK

Ankaraspor footballers
Hønefoss BK players
Molde FK players
Senegalese footballers
Expatriate footballers in Norway
Expatriate footballers in Turkey
Expatriate footballers in Syria
Senegalese expatriate footballers
Eliteserien players
Süper Lig players
MKE Ankaragücü footballers
Living people
1982 births
Senegalese expatriate sportspeople in Turkey
Footballers from Dakar
Senegalese expatriate sportspeople in Norway
Senegalese expatriate sportspeople in Syria
AS Douanes (Senegal) players
Strømmen IF players
Norwegian First Division players
Association football forwards
Syrian Premier League players
Expatriate footballers in Lebanon
Senegalese expatriate sportspeople in Lebanon
Lebanese Premier League players
Al Mabarra Club players